The Cape Verde women's national football team is the representative women's association football team of Cape Verde. Its governing body is the Cape Verdean Football Federation (FCF) and it competes as a member of the Confederation of African Football (CAF).

The national team's first activity was in 2018, when they played a friendly game against Guinea-Bissau in which they lost, goal to nil. Cape Verde is currently unranked in the FIFA Women's World Rankings. Czpe Verde is yet to participate in a major tournament, having only participated in 2020 WAFU Zone A Women's Cup finishing fourth.

Record per opponent
Key

The following table shows Cape Verde' all-time official international record per opponent:

Results

2018

2019

2020

2021

2022

2023

See also
 Cape Verde national football team results

References

External links
 Cape Verde results on The Roon Ba
  Cape Verde results on Globalsports
 Cape Verde results on worldfootball.net

2010s in Cape Verde
2020s in Cape Verde
Women's national association football team results